Jodorowsky's Dune is a 2013 American-French documentary film directed by Frank Pavich. The film explores cult film director Alejandro Jodorowsky's unsuccessful attempt to adapt and film Frank Herbert's 1965 science fiction novel Dune in the mid-1970s.

Background
In 1971, the production company Apjac International (APJ) headed by film producer Arthur P. Jacobs optioned the rights to film Dune. However, Jacobs died in 1973 before a film could be developed.

In December 1974, a French consortium led by Jean-Paul Gibon purchased the film rights from APJ, with director Alejandro Jodorowsky set to direct. Along with French producer Michel Seydoux, Jodorowsky proceeded to approach, among others, Virgin Records with the prog rock groups Tangerine Dream, Gong and Mike Oldfield before settling on Pink Floyd and Magma for some of the music; artists H. R. Giger, Chris Foss and Jean Giraud for set and character design; Dan O'Bannon for special effects; and Salvador Dalí, Orson Welles, Gloria Swanson, David Carradine, Mick Jagger, Udo Kier, Amanda Lear and others for the cast. Jodorowsky intended his son Brontis, 12 years old at the start of pre-production, to star as Paul Atreides.

Herbert traveled to Europe in 1976 to find that $2 million of the $9.5 million budget had already been spent in pre-production and that Jodorowsky's script would result in a 14-hour film ("It was the size of a phone book", Herbert later recalled). Jodorowsky took creative liberties with the source material, but Herbert said that he and Jodorowsky had an amicable relationship. After two and a half years in development, the project ultimately stalled for financial reasons since $5 million was still missing to round off the $15-million total budget.

After the film rights lapsed in 1982, they were purchased by Italian producer Dino De Laurentiis, who eventually released the 1984 film Dune, directed by David Lynch.

In January 2023, Pavich published an essay in The New York Times related to Jodorowsky's Dune (and more) that involved artwork generated by artificial intelligence (A.I.) programming.

Content
Acclaimed comic artist Jean "Moebius" Giraud worked with Jodorowsky to create a storyboard composed of 3000 drawings that depicted the entire film.

Salvador Dalí was set to play the Emperor and claimed he wanted to be the highest-paid actor in Hollywood history. He asked for $100,000 per hour to act in the movie. Jodorowsky accepted, but then reduced the Emperor’s scenes so that Dalí would be needed for no more than one hour with the rest of his lines spoken by a robotic lookalike. Dalí accepted on condition that the plastic lookalike was donated to his museum, and that his throne was to be a toilet made up of two intersected dolphins.

Jodorowsky's refusal to compromise on Dune'''s running time was one main reason the film did not get made. Hollywood did not want the film's length to exceed two hours. Jodorowsky felt 10 to 14 hours would be more appropriate for the adaptation.

The film notes that Jodorowsky's script, extensive storyboards, and concept art were sent to all major film studios, and argues that these influenced and inspired later film productions, including Star Wars, the Alien series, Flash Gordon, the Terminator series, and The Fifth Element. In particular, the Jodorowsky-assembled team of O'Bannon, Foss, Giger, and Giraud went on to collaborate on the 1979 film Alien.

"It was a great undertaking to do the script," Jodorowsky says in the film. Speaking of Herbert's novel, he says: "It's very, it's like Proust, I compare it to great literature."

The documentary concludes that Jodorowsky's efforts did not go to waste, and that he and Giraud recycled much of their concepts for The Incal, a series of graphic novels that began publishing in 1980.

Production
The project was officially announced in May 2011. Director Pavich filmed an extensive series of interviews with the principal players involved in the failed 1970s adaptation, shooting in France, Switzerland, the United Kingdom, and the United States.

ReleaseJodorowsky's Dune premiered at the Director's Fortnight at the 2013 Cannes Film Festival in May 2013. Sony Pictures Classics acquired the North American distribution rights to the film in July 2013, and later announced a theatrical release date of March 7, 2014. The film was released on DVD and on-demand on July 8, 2014.

Reception
The film has received critical acclaim. Variety called it a "mind-blowing cult movie" and said that director Pavich "happens upon a compelling theory: that even in its still-born form, the film manifested the sort of collective [consciousness] that Jodorowsky was trying to peddle through its plot, trickling down to influence other sci-fi films that followed". The Hollywood Reporter declared the "entertaining documentary makes the case for this overblown epic as a legendary lost masterpiece". Entertainment Weekly named Jodorowsky's Dune as one of its 10 Best Movies of 2014.

Review aggregation website Rotten Tomatoes gave Jodorowsky's Dune a 98% approval rating based on reviews from 122 critics, with an average rating of 8/10. The site's consensus states: "Part thoughtful tribute, part bittersweet reminder of a missed opportunity, Jodorowsky's Dune offers a fascinating look at a lost sci-fi legend." Metacritic gives the film a 79% rating based on 31 critics, indicating "generally favorable reviews".

In the second episode of the Netflix series Russian Doll, Jodorowsky's Dune is used as a password.

Accolades

Top-ten lists
The film appeared on several critics' year-end lists.

 2nd – Alex Biese, Asbury Park Press 2nd – Wired Staff, Wired 3rd – Liam Lacey, The Globe and Mail 5th – Neil Rosen, NY1
 5th – Mike Gencarelli, MediaMikes.com
 5th – Most Underrated – Angry Nerd, Wired 6th – Richard Corliss, Time 6th – TT Stern-Enzi, Cincinnati City Beat 7th – Giovanni Fazio, The Japan Times 7th – Steve Persall, Tampa Bay Times 8th – Jeffrey M. Anderson, The San Francisco Examiner 10th – Chris Nashawaty, Entertainment Weekly 10th – Erik Henriksen, The Portland Mercury 10th – Kirk Baird, The Blade Honorable Mention – James Verniere, Boston Herald Honorable Mention – John Beifuss, The Commercial Appeal Honorable Mention – Kristian Lin, Fort Worth Weekly Honorable Mention – Brian Miller, Seattle Weekly Included in Best Documentaries – Ann Hornaday, Washington Post Runner Up – A.O. Scott, The New York Times''

References

External links
 
  (Sony Pictures Classics)
 

 
 
 

Alejandro Jodorowsky
2013 films
2013 documentary films
American documentary films
French documentary films
2010s English-language films
2010s French-language films
2010s German-language films
2010s Spanish-language films
Documentary films about unfinished films
Films based on Dune (franchise)
Spanish-language American films
2010s American films
2010s French films
Sony Pictures Classics films